Hemmatabad (also Romanized as Hemmatābād) is a village in Salehabad Rural District, Salehabad County, Razavi Khorasan Province, Iran. At the 2006 census, its population was 436, in 101 families.

References 

Populated places in   Torbat-e Jam County